D&B Hoovers was founded by Gary Hoover and Patrick Spain in 1990 as an American business research company that provided information on companies and industries through their primary product platform named "Hoover's". In 2003, it was acquired by Dun & Bradstreet and operated for a time as a wholly owned subsidiary. In 2017, the Hoover's product was re-branded D&B Hoovers. Dun & Bradstreet is headquartered in Short Hills, New Jersey, US. D&B Hoovers has sales, marketing and development resources in Austin, Texas, US.

Origins and expansion 
Hoovers was started in 1990 by Gary Hoover, Patrick J. Spain, Alan Chai, and Alta Campbell. Leading up to this, Hoover had founded the Bookstop book store chain, ultimately purchase by Barnes & Noble.[citation needed] Hoover's initially was called The Reference Press as it published reference books about companies.

The company grew rapidly under a business team led by Spain. This team iincluded Carl Shepherd, Lynn Atchison, Elisabeth DeMarse, Jani Spede, Kris Rao, and Gordon Anderson, among others. Spain was CEO from 1993 to 2001, and chairman from 1994 to 2002.

Hoovers made an initial public offering on the NASDAQ exchange in 1999. The company then became a subsidiary of Dun & Bradstreet, which bought Hoover's for $119 million in 2003. After the acquisition of Avention by Dun & Bradstreet in 2017, the D&B Hoovers solution was launched, and replaced the existing Hoovers' product.

Operations 
Dun & Bradstreet maintains a database of more than 330 million companies with 30,000 global data sources updated 5 million times per day. It combines Dun & Bradstreet's data with Avention's sales acceleration platform. Subscriptions are sold primarily to sales, marketing, and business development professionals seeking contact information for prospective customers. The database is used for lead generation, outreach, prepping for sales calls, researching companies, being alerted to changes in leadership, and acquiring new customers.

Besides publishing information through the D&B Hoovers product, information is also distributed via data feeds and third-party licensing agreements.

D&B Hoovers claims to offer proprietary business information through an online platform and integrated workflow solutions,  houses data on more than 120 million business records across 1,000 industries.

See also
 List of companies based in Austin, Texas

References 

Online databases
American companies established in 1990
Companies based in Austin, Texas
Dun & Bradstreet
1999 initial public offerings
2003 mergers and acquisitions